The Fritzl case emerged in 2008, when a woman named Elisabeth Fritzl (born 6 April 1966) told police in the town of Amstetten, Lower Austria, that she had been held captive for 24 years by her father, Josef Fritzl (born 9 April 1935). Fritzl had assaulted, sexually abused, and raped his daughter repeatedly during her imprisonment inside a concealed area in the cellar of the family home. The abuse resulted in the birth of seven children: three of them remained in captivity with their mother; one died shortly after birth and was cremated by Fritzl; and the other three were brought up by Fritzl and his wife, Rosemarie, having been reported as foundlings.

Josef Fritzl was arrested on suspicion of rape, false imprisonment, manslaughter by negligence, and incest. In March 2009, he pleaded guilty to all counts and was sentenced to life imprisonment.

History

Josef Fritzl was born on 9 April 1935, in Amstetten, Lower Austria. In 1956, at age 21, he married 17-year-old Rosemarie (born September 23, 1939), with whom he had three sons and four daughters, including Elisabeth, who was born on 6 April 1966. Fritzl reportedly began sexually abusing Elisabeth in 1977, when she was aged 11.

After completing compulsory education at age 15, Elisabeth started a course to become a waitress. In January 1983 she ran away from home and went into hiding in Vienna with a friend from work. She was found by police within three weeks and returned to her parents in Amstetten. She rejoined her waitress course, finished it in mid-1984, and was offered a job in nearby Linz.

Captivity
On 28 August 1984, after Elisabeth turned 18, Fritzl lured her into the basement of the family home, saying that he needed help carrying a door. In reality, Fritzl had been converting the basement into a makeshift prison chamber; the door was the last thing he needed to seal it. After Elisabeth held the door in place while Fritzl fitted it into the frame, he held an ether-soaked towel on her face until she was unconscious, then threw her into the chamber.

After Elisabeth's disappearance, Rosemarie filed a missing persons report. Almost a month later, Fritzl handed over a letter to the police, the first of several that he had forced Elisabeth to write while she was in captivity. The letter, postmarked Braunau, stated that she was tired of living with her family and was staying with a friend; she warned her parents not to look for her or she would leave the country. Fritzl told police that she had most likely joined a cult.

Over the next 24 years, Fritzl went to the hidden chamber almost every day, or a minimum of three times a week, bringing food and other supplies, and repeatedly raping her. Elisabeth gave birth to seven children during her captivity. One child died shortly after birth, and three—Lisa, Monika, and Alexander—were removed from the chamber as infants to live with Fritzl and his wife, who were approved by local social services authorities as their foster parents. Officials said that Fritzl "very plausibly" explained how three of his infant grandchildren had appeared on his doorstep. The family received regular visits from social workers, who saw and heard nothing to arouse their suspicions.

The captives had a television, a radio, and a videocassette player. Food could be stored in a refrigerator and cooked or heated on hot plates. Elisabeth taught the children to read and write. At times, Fritzl would punish the family by shutting off their lights or refusing to deliver food for days at a time. Fritzl told Elisabeth and the three children who remained (Kerstin, Stefan, and Felix) that they would be gassed if they tried to escape. Investigators concluded that this was an empty threat to frighten the victims; there was no gas supply to the basement. He also told them that they would be electrocuted if they tried to meddle with the cellar door.

According to Fritzl's sister-in-law Christine, he went into the basement every morning at 09:00, ostensibly to draw plans for machines which he sold to manufacturing firms. He often stayed there for the night and did not allow his wife to bring him coffee. A tenant who rented a ground floor room in the house for twelve years claimed to hear noises from the basement, which Fritzl said were caused by the "faulty pipes" or the gas heating system.

Discovery
On 19 April 2008, Fritzl agreed to seek medical attention after Kerstin, Elisabeth's eldest daughter, fell unconscious. Elisabeth helped him carry Kerstin out of the chamber and saw the outside world for the first time in 24 years. He forced her to return to the chamber, where she remained for a final week. Kerstin was taken by ambulance to a local hospital, the Landesklinikum Amstetten, and was admitted in serious condition with life-threatening kidney failure. Fritzl later arrived at the hospital claiming to have found a note written by Kerstin's mother. He discussed Kerstin's condition and the note with a doctor, Albert Reiter.

Medical staff found aspects of Fritzl's story puzzling and alerted the police on 21 April. The police broadcast an appeal on public media for the missing mother to come forward and provide information about Kerstin's medical history. The police reopened the case file on Elisabeth's disappearance. Fritzl repeated his story about Elisabeth being in a cult, and presented what he claimed was the "most recent letter" from her, dated January 2008, posted from the town of Kematen. The police contacted Manfred Wohlfahrt, a church officer and expert on cults, who raised doubts about the existence of the group Fritzl described. He noted that Elisabeth's letters seemed dictated and oddly written.

Elisabeth pleaded with Fritzl to be taken to the hospital. On 26 April, he released her from the cellar along with her sons Stefan and Felix, bringing them upstairs. He and Elisabeth went to the hospital where Kerstin was being treated on 26 April 2008. Following a tip-off from Reiter that Fritzl and Elisabeth were at the hospital, the police detained them on the hospital grounds and took them to a police station for questioning.

Elisabeth did not provide police with more details until they promised her that she would never have to see her father again. Over the next two hours, she told the story of her 24 years in captivity. Elisabeth recounted that Fritzl raped her and forced her to watch pornographic videos, which he made her re-enact with him in front of her children in order to humiliate her. Shortly after midnight, police officers completed the investigation. Fritzl, aged 73, was arrested on 26 April on suspicion of serious crimes against family members.

During the night of 27 April, Elisabeth, her children and her mother Rosemarie were taken into care. Police said Fritzl told investigators how to enter the basement chamber through a small hidden door, opened by a secret keyless entry code. Rosemarie had been unaware of what had been happening to Elisabeth.

On 29 April, it was announced that DNA evidence confirmed Fritzl as the biological father of his daughter's children. His defence lawyer, Rudolf Mayer, said that although the DNA test proved incest, evidence was still needed for the allegations of rape and enslavement. In their 1 May daily press conference, Austrian police said that Fritzl had forced Elisabeth to write a letter the previous year indicating that he may have been planning to release her and the children. The letter said that she wanted to come home but "it's not possible yet." Police believe Fritzl was planning to pretend to have rescued his daughter from her fictitious cult. Police spokesman Franz Polzer said police planned to interview at least 100 people who had lived as tenants in the Fritzl apartment building in the previous 24 years.

Cell
The Fritzl property in Amstetten is a building dating from around 1890. A newer building was added after 1978 when Fritzl applied for a building permit for an "extension with basement." In 1983, building inspectors visited the site and verified that the new extension had been built according to the dimensions specified on the permit. Fritzl had illegally enlarged the room by excavating space for a much larger basement, concealed by walls. Around 1981 or 1982, according to his statement, Fritzl started to turn this hidden cellar into a prison cell and installed a washbasin, toilet, bed, hot plate, and refrigerator. In 1983, he added more space by creating a passageway to a pre-existing basement area under the old part of the property, of which only he knew.

The concealed cellar had a  corridor, a storage area, and three small open cells, connected by narrow passageways; and a basic cooking area and bathroom facilities, followed by two sleeping areas, which were equipped with two beds each. It was located behind a shelf in Fritzl's basement workshop, protected by an electronic code entered using a remote control unit. In order to reach this door, five locking basement rooms had to be crossed. To get to the area where Elisabeth and her children were held, eight doors in total needed to be unlocked, of which two doors were additionally secured by electronic locking devices.

Key events

Perpetrator

Background
Josef Fritzl (now known as Mayrhoff) was born on 9 April 1935, in Amstetten to Josef Fritzl Sr. and Maria Fritzl (née Nenning). He grew up as an only child raised solely by his working mother. His father, who was a severe alcoholic, had deserted the family when Fritzl was four, and never again came into contact with him. Fritzl Sr. later fought as a soldier in the Wehrmacht during World War II, and was killed in action in 1944. His name appears on a memorial plaque in Amstetten. 

In 1956, Fritzl married his wife, Rosemarie.

After completing his education at an HTL Technical College with a qualification in electrical engineering, Fritzl obtained a job at Voestalpine in Linz. From 1969 until 1971, he held a job in a construction-material firm in Amstetten. Later, he became a technical equipment salesman, travelling throughout Austria. He retired from active employment when he turned 60 in 1995, but continued some commercial activities. In addition to his apartment building in Amstetten, Fritzl rented out several other properties. In 1972, he purchased a guesthouse and an adjacent campsite at Lake Mondsee. He ran it, together with his wife, until 1996.

Criminal history
In 1967, Fritzl broke into the Linz home of a 24-year-old nurse while her husband was away and raped her while holding a knife to her throat, threatening to kill her if she screamed. According to an annual report for 1967 and a press release of the same year, he was also named as a suspect in a case of attempted rape of a 21-year-old woman, and was known for indecent exposure. Fritzl was arrested and served 12 months of an 18-month prison sentence. In accordance with Austrian law, his criminal record was expunged after 15 years. As a result, more than 25 years later, when he applied to adopt and/or foster Elisabeth's children, the local social service authorities did not discover his criminal history.

Self-portrayal and psychiatric assessment
After his arrest, Fritzl claimed that his behaviour toward his daughter did not constitute rape but was consensual. Mayer forwarded extracts from the minutes of his talks with his client to the Austrian weekly News for publication. According to these statements, Fritzl said that he "always knew during the whole 24 years that what I was doing was not right, that I must have been crazy to do such a thing, yet it became a normal occurrence to lead a second life in the basement of my house."

Regarding his treatment of the family he had with his wife, Fritzl stated, "I am not the beast the media make me to be." Regarding his treatment of Elisabeth and her children in the cellar, he explained that he brought flowers for Elisabeth and books and toys for the children into the "bunker," as he called it, and often watched videos with the children and ate meals with Elisabeth and the children. Fritzl decided to imprison Elisabeth after she "did not adhere to any rules any more" when she became a teenager. "That is why I had to do something; I had to create a place where I could keep Elisabeth, by force if necessary, away from the outside world." He suggested that the emphasis on discipline in the Nazi era, during which he grew up until the age of 10, might have influenced his views about decency and good behaviour. The chief editors of News magazine noted in their editorial that they expected Fritzl's statement to form the basis of the defence strategy of his lawyer. Critics said his statement may have been a ploy to prepare an insanity defence.

Reflecting on his childhood, Fritzl initially described his mother as "the best woman in the world" and "as strict as it was necessary." Later, he expressed a negative opinion of his mother and claimed that "she used to beat me, hit me until I was lying in a pool of blood on the floor. It left me feeling totally humiliated and weak. My mother was a servant and she used to work hard all her life, I never had a kiss from her, I was never cuddled although I wanted it – I wanted her to be good to me." He also claimed that she called him "a Satan, a criminal, a no-good," that he "had a horrible fear of her." In 1959, after Fritzl had married and bought his house, his mother moved in with them. Over time, their roles reversed, and his mother came to fear him. Eventually, he also admitted he had later locked his mother in the attic and bricked up her window after telling neighbors that she had died, and kept her locked up until her death in 1980. It is unknown how long Fritzl kept his mother locked up in his attic, but newspapers have speculated that it may have been up to 20 years.

In a report by forensic psychiatrist Adelheid Kastner, Fritzl's mother is described as unpredictable and abusive. Fritzl referred to himself as an "alibi" child, meaning that his mother only gave birth to him to prove that she was not barren and could produce children. Fritzl claims that his pathological behaviour is innate. During his prison stint for the earlier rape conviction, he admits that he planned to lock his daughter up so that he could contain and express his "evil side." He said, "I was born to rape, and I held myself back for a relatively long time. I could have behaved a lot worse than locking up my daughter." The forensic psychiatrist diagnosed Fritzl as having a "severe combined personality disorder" which included borderline, schizotypal and schizoid types and a sexual disorder and recommended that Fritzl receive psychiatric care for the rest of his life.

Later reports have revealed Fritzl's premeditated plan to lock his daughter up was not for discipline but for his own gratification.

Prosecutor's investigation
Pursuant to the agreement that she would never have to see her father again, Elisabeth Fritzl gave videotaped testimony before Austrian prosecutors and investigators on 11 July 2008.

On 13 November 2008, authorities in Austria released an indictment against Josef Fritzl. He stood trial for the murder of the infant Michael, who died shortly after birth, and faced between 10 years and life imprisonment. He was also charged with rape, incest, kidnapping, false imprisonment and slavery, which carry a maximum 20-year term.

Trial
The trial of Josef Fritzl commenced on 16 March 2009, in the city of Sankt Pölten, presided over by Judge Andrea .

On day one, Fritzl entered the courtroom attempting to hide his face from cameras behind a blue folder, which he was entitled to do under Austrian law. After opening comments, all journalists and spectators were asked to leave the courtroom, whereupon Fritzl lowered his binder. Fritzl pleaded guilty to all charges with the exception of murder and grievous assault by threatening to gas his captives if they disobeyed him.

In his opening remarks, Rudolf Mayer, the defending counsel, appealed to the jury to be objective and not be swayed by emotions. He insisted Fritzl was "not a monster," stating that Fritzl had brought a Christmas tree down to his captives in the cellar during the holiday season.

Christiane Burkheiser, prosecuting her first case since being appointed Chief Prosecutor, pressed for life imprisonment in an institution for the criminally insane.

On the first day of testimony, jurors watched eleven hours of testimony recorded by Elisabeth in sessions with police and psychologists in July 2008. The tape is said to have been so "harrowing" that the eight jurors did not watch more than two hours at a time. Four replacement jurors were on standby to replace any of the regular jurors in case they could not bear to hear any more of the evidence.

Besides the video testimony, Elisabeth's older brother Harald testified and said that he was physically abused by Fritzl as a child. Fritzl's wife, Rosemarie, and Elisabeth's children refused to testify.

On 18 March 2009, Elisabeth Fritzl attended the second day of the criminal trial against her father, in preparation for a book she wrote about her ordeal. She did not plan to see her father again. Fritzl's attorney, Rudolf Mayer, confirmed that she had been in the visitors' gallery in disguise at the time her video testimony was aired. "Josef Fritzl recognised that Elisabeth was in court and, from this point on, you could see Josef Fritzl going pale and he broke down," Mayer said. "It was a meeting of eyes that changed his mind." The next day, Fritzl began the proceedings by approaching the judge and changing his pleas to guilty on all charges.

On 19 March 2009, Fritzl was sentenced to life imprisonment without the possibility of parole for 15 years. He said that he accepted the sentence and would not appeal. Fritzl is currently serving out his sentence in Garsten Abbey, a former monastery in Upper Austria that has been converted into a prison.

Government response
Chancellor of Austria Alfred Gusenbauer said he planned to launch a foreign public image campaign for his country, in light of the "abominable events."

Aftermath
Judge , who presided over the trial, stated medical experts reported Elisabeth and her children were in "relatively good health."

After being taken into care, Elisabeth, all six of her surviving children and her mother were housed in a local clinic where they were shielded from the outside environment and received medical and psychological treatment. Members of the Fritzl family were offered new identities, but it was emphasized that it was their choice to make.

Berthold Kepplinger, head of the clinic where Elisabeth and her children were being treated, said that Elisabeth and the three children held captive in the cellar required further therapy to help them adjust to the light after years in semi-darkness. They also needed treatment to help them cope with all the extra space that they now had in which to move about.

In May 2008, a handmade poster created by Elisabeth, her children and her mother at the therapy facility was displayed in the Amstetten Town Centre. The message thanked local people for their support. "We, the whole family, would like to take the opportunity to thank all of you for sympathy at our fate," they wrote in their message. "Your compassion is helping us greatly to overcome these difficult times, and it shows us there also are good and honest people here who really care for us. We hope that soon there will be a time where we can find our way back into a normal life."

Kerstin was reunited with her family on 8 June 2008, when she was awakened from her artificially induced coma. Doctors said that she would make a full recovery.

It was revealed that Elisabeth and her children were more traumatized than previously thought. During captivity, Kerstin tore out her hair in clumps, and was reported to have shredded her dresses before stuffing them in the toilet. It has also been revealed that normal everyday occurrences, such as the dimming of lights or the closing of doors, plunge Kerstin and Stefan into anxiety and panic attacks. The other three of Elisabeth's children who were raised by their father are being treated for anger and resentment at the events.

In late July 2008, it emerged that Elisabeth ordered her mother Rosemarie out of the villa they had been sharing in a secret location set up for them by a psychiatric clinic. Elisabeth was upset about Rosemarie's passiveness during her upbringing.

Lawyer Christoph Herbst, who represents Elisabeth and her family, said, "Fortunately, everything is going very well"; they spend their time answering hundreds of letters from all over the world. Felix, Kerstin, and Stefan, brought up underground with their mother, have learned to swim. All of Elisabeth's children attended a four-day summer camp organised by firefighters, with 4,000 other young campers, in August 2008. The children, along with their mother, have also made day trips, including swimming outings, on which care was taken to keep them out of reach of the paparazzi and to protect their privacy.

In March 2009, Elisabeth and her children were forced to move out of the family's hide-away home and returned to the psychiatric clinic where medical staff had started trying to heal the family and unite the "upstairs" and "downstairs" siblings during the previous year. Elisabeth was reported to be distraught and close to a breakdown after a British paparazzo had burst into her kitchen and started taking photographs.

After the trial, Elisabeth and her six children were moved to an unnamed village in northern Austria, where they were living in a fortress-like house. All of the children require ongoing therapy. Factors that traumatised the "upstairs" children include learning that Fritzl had lied to them about their mother abandoning them, the abuse they had received from him during their childhood, and finding out that their siblings had been imprisoned in the cellar. The "downstairs" children receive therapy due to their deprivation from normal development, the lack of fresh air and sunshine while living confined in the basement, and the abuse that they and their mother had received from Fritzl when he came to the basement. All of the children might have genetic problems common to children born of an incestuous relationship. Elisabeth was said to be estranged from her mother, Rosemarie, who accepted Fritzl's story about Elisabeth joining a cult and did not pursue the matter further, but Elisabeth allows her three children who grew up in Josef and Rosemarie's house to visit their grandmother regularly. Rosemarie lives alone in a small apartment.

An article in March 2010 in The Independent stated that Elisabeth and her children recovered remarkably well, given the difficult lives they endured for so long. According to Josef's sister-in-law, Christine, Elisabeth enjoys spending her time shopping, taking frequent showers, and driving. She has passed her driving test without difficulty. Her relationship with Thomas Wagner, one of her bodyguards (who is 23 years younger than Elisabeth), was reported to be ongoing, with him becoming a big-brother figure to her children. All of Elisabeth's children have developed normal sibling relationships with each other, and after having trouble dealing with the traumatic events, the three "upstairs" children slowly began recognising Elisabeth as their mother. The children enjoy being outdoors, playing video games, and spending time with their mother and grandmother. Despite their strained relationship, Elisabeth and her mother Rosemarie started visiting each other more, and Elisabeth has reportedly forgiven her mother for believing her father's story.

On 28 June 2013, workers began filling the basement of the Fritzl home with concrete. Estate liquidator Walter Anzboeck stated that the construction would cost €100,000 and would take a week to complete. The house was to be sold on the open market. While most neighbours approved of the proposal, some preferred that the property be demolished due to its sordid history. Asylum seekers were offered the house to live in. The house was sold for €160,000 in December 2016, with the buyers voicing their intention to convert the building into apartments.

In May 2017, Josef Fritzl changed his name to Josef Mayrhoff, probably due to getting into a prison fight that resulted in several of his teeth getting knocked out after other inmates set up a fake dating profile with his name and picture. Mark Perry, a British journalist who interviewed Fritzl in his cell, says he has shown no remorse for his crimes. He recalls he kept saying "just look into the cellars of other people, you might find other families and girls down there."

In April 2019, it was reported that Fritzl's health was declining and that he did not want to live anymore.

In September 2021, a decision was made to release Fritzl from a psychiatric detention facility to a regular prison, where he was to continue to serve his life sentence. That decision was based on a psychiatric report which said he no longer posed any danger. The ruling was appealed, and in late April 2022, a panel of three judges decided that Josef Fritzl could be moved. The decision was based on a supplementary psychiatric report submitted in March. However, a court ruled that he will remain in the psychiatric facility until an appeal to the Higher Regional Court in Vienna is heard. There are reports that he is suffering from dementia. The move to a regular prison means that Fritzl, who received a life sentence, will be eligible for parole in 2023, having served the initial 15 years of his sentence.

True crime media 
The case was featured in the 2008 documentary, The Longest Night: Secrets of the Austrian Cellar and the 2010 documentary, Monster: The Josef Fritzl Story.

The 2009 book, The Crimes of Josef Fritzl: Uncovering the Truth, by Stefanie Marsh and Bojan Pancevski, is about the case.

The 2009 true crime book Secrets in the Cellar by John Glatt details the case. 

Room author Emma Donoghue was inspired by the crimes, and her novel inspired a film adaptation with the same name.

In 2021, Lifetime released a film inspired by the Fritzl case titled Girl in the Basement which is part of Lifetime's "Ripped from the Headlines" feature films. The film is directed by Elisabeth Röhm and it stars Stefanie Scott, Judd Nelson, and Joely Fisher.

See also

 Alvarez incest case
 Ariel Castro kidnappings
 Armando Lucero
 Inbreeding
 Kidnapping of Jaycee Lee Dugard
 List of child abuse cases featuring long-term detention
 List of kidnappings
 Lydia Gouardo
 Moe incest case
 Mongelli case
 Natascha Kampusch
 Sheffield incest case
 2019 South Wales paternal sex abuse case

References

 

2000s missing person cases
2008 crimes in Austria
2008 in Austria
2009 in Austria
Child sexual abuse in Austria
Formerly missing people
Incestual abuse
Incidents of violence against women
Lower Austria
Missing person cases in Austria
People convicted of incest
Rape in Austria
Incidents of violence against girls